Double Rainbow is Aya Matsuura's sixth album (her fifth studio album), containing two of her previously released singles. It was released on October 10, 2007.

Track listing 
 
 "HAPPY TO GO!"
 
 
 "blue bird"
 
 
 
 
 
 

2007 albums
Aya Matsuura albums